The Herring Motor Car Company Building, also known as 10th Street Lofts, is a historic building located in downtown Des Moines, Iowa, United States. It was designed by the Des Moines architectural firm of Proudfoot, Bird & Rawson in the Classical Revival style. Clyde L. Herring had the building built in 1912 and it was completed the following year. It was originally a four-story building and two more floors were added 18 months after it was originally built. By 1915 the company was building 32 Ford automobiles a day, and had delivered “more automobiles than any other one automobile agency in the United States”. Along with the neighboring Standard Glass and Paint Company Building it is part of the same loft apartment complex. The National Biscuit Company Building on the other side of the building has also been converted into an apartment building. It was listed on the National Register of Historic Places in 2004.

References

Industrial buildings completed in 1913
National Register of Historic Places in Des Moines, Iowa
Industrial buildings and structures on the National Register of Historic Places in Iowa
Apartment buildings in Des Moines, Iowa
Neoclassical architecture in Iowa
1913 establishments in Iowa
Motor vehicle manufacturing plants on the National Register of Historic Places
Transportation buildings and structures on the National Register of Historic Places in Iowa